This is a list of credit unions in the United States. 

A credit union is a member-owned financial cooperative, democratically controlled by its members, and operated for the purpose of promoting thrift, providing credit at competitive rates, and providing other financial services to its members. Credit unions in the United States may either be chartered by the federal government or a state government. The National Credit Union Administration is the U.S. independent federal agency that supervises and charters federal credit unions. As of 2016, in the United States, there were 5,757 federally insured credit unions with 103.992 million members comprising 45.4 percent of the economically active population. As of December 31, 2021, there were 4,942 federally insured credit unions in the United States with 129.6 million members.

Credit union leagues
 Association of Vermont Credit Unions
 California and Nevada Credit Union Leagues
 Cornerstone Credit Union League
 Ohio Credit Union League

Credit unions

A–M

 Bilal 2D Credit Union
 Addition Financial
 Affinity Federal Credit Union
 Affinity Plus Federal Credit Union
 AFL–CIO Employees Federal Credit Union
 Aggieland Credit Union
 LUND Federal Credit Union
 Alaska USA Federal Credit Union
 Alliant Credit Union
 American Airlines Federal Credit Union
 America First Credit Union
 Apple Federal Credit Union
 Arrowhead Credit Union
 Arsenal Credit Union (National Geospatial-Intelligence Agency)
 Ascend Federal Credit Union
 Associated Credit Union
 Atlanta Postal Credit Union
 BECU
 Belvoir Federal Credit Union
 Bethpage Federal Credit Union
 Beulah Federal Credit Union
 BMI Federal Credit Union
 Boulder Dam Credit Union
 Buckeye State Credit Union
 Cascade Community Federal Credit Union
 California Credit Union
 Call Federal Credit Union
 Caltech Employees Federal Credit Union
 Chartway Federal Credit Union
 Christian Community Credit Union 
 Citizens Equity First Credit Union
 Clearview Federal Credit Union
 Coastal Federal Credit Union
 Commonwealth Credit Union
 CommunityAmerica Credit Union
 Consumers Credit Union
 CoVantage Credit Union
 Credit Union 1 (Alaska)
 Credit Union 1 (Illinois)
 Dakotaland Federal Credit Union
 Del-One
 Delta Community Credit Union
 Denali Alaskan Federal Credit Union
 Desert Financial Credit Union
 DFCU Financial
 Digital Federal Credit Union
 Eastman Credit Union
 Ent Credit Union
 Envision Credit Union
 ESL Federal Credit Union
 Fairwinds Credit Union
 First Citizens' Federal Credit Union
 First Entertainment Credit Union
 First Jersey Credit Union
 First Tech Federal Credit Union
 Five County Credit Union 
 Florida State University Credit Union
 Fox Communities Credit Union, Wisconsin
 Fox Federal Credit Union
 Genisys Credit Union
 Georgetown University Alumni and Student Federal Credit Union 
 Georgia's Own Credit Union
 Golden 1 Credit Union
 Government Employees Credit Union (El Paso), Texas
 Great Wisconsin Credit Union
 Greater Texas Credit Union
 Hawaii Community Federal Credit Union
 Hawaii State Federal Credit Union
 Holyoke Credit Union
 Hudson Valley Credit Union
 IBM Southeast Employees' Federal Credit Union
 Idaho Central Credit Union
 iQ Credit Union
 Keesler Federal Credit Union
 KeyPoint Federal Credit Union
 Kinecta Federal Credit Union
 Lafayette Federal Credit Union
 Lake Michigan Credit Union
 Lake Trust Credit Union
 Landmark Credit Union
 Langley Federal Credit Union
 Marine Credit Union
 Melrose Credit Union (Closed)
 Member One Federal Credit Union
 Merck Sharp & Dohme Federal Credit Union
 Metro Credit Union
 Michigan Schools and Government Credit Union
 Michigan State University Federal Credit Union
 MidFlorida Credit Union
 Meriwest Credit Union
 Mountain America Credit Union
 Municipal Credit Union

N–Z

 NASA Federal Credit Union
 NavyArmy Community Credit Union, Texas
 Navy Federal Credit Union
 Nevada Federal Credit Union
 New England Federal Credit Union
 New Mexico Educators Federal Credit Union
 Northwest Federal Credit Union
 Notre Dame Federal Credit Union
 Numerica Credit Union
 Nusenda Credit Union
 Oakland University Credit Union
 OBEE Credit Uniion
 Ocean Financial Federal Credit Union
 OnPoint Community Credit Union
 Pacific Marine Credit Union, California
 Partners Federal Credit Union
 Patelco Credit Union, California
 Pentagon Federal Credit Union
 PeoplesChoice Credit Union
 Penn State Federal Credit Union
 Polish & Slavic Federal Credit Union
 PrimeWay Federal Credit Union
 Progressive Credit Union
 Premier America
 PSECU, Pennsylvania
 Randolph-Brooks Federal Credit Union, Texas
 Redstone Federal Credit Union
 Credit Union of Richmond
 Robins Financial Credit Union
 Rogue Credit Union
 San Diego County Credit Union
 Santa Clara County Federal Credit Union
 SchoolsFirst Federal Credit Union
 Seattle Credit Union
 Security Service Federal Credit Union, Texas, Colorado, and Utah
 Service Credit Union
 Sikorsky Credit Union
 SkyOne Federal Credit Union
 South Carolina Federal Credit Union
 Southland Credit Union
 Spero Financial Federal Credit Union
 Spire Credit Union
 Spokane Teachers Credit Union
 Stanford Federal Credit Union
 Star One Credit Union
 State Employees Credit Union of North Carolina
 Summit Credit Union
 Suncoast Schools Federal Credit Union
 Superior Credit Union
 Technicolor Federal Credit Union
 Texas Dow Employees Credit Union
 Tinker Federal Credit Union
 Town & Country Federal Credit Union
 Treasury Department Federal Credit Union
 Triangle Credit Union
 Tropical Financial Credit Union
 Truliant Federal Credit Union
 TruChoice Federal Credit Union
 TruMark Financial Credit Union
 TruWest Credit Union
 TULIP Cooperative Credit Union
 Tyco Federal Credit Union
 U of I Community Credit Union, Illinois
 The Union Credit Union
 UMassFive College Federal Credit Union
 United Federal Credit Union
 United Heritage Credit Union
 United Nations Federal Credit Union
 University Credit Union
 University of Kentucky Federal Credit Union
 University of Michigan Credit Union
 University of Wisconsin Credit Union
 U.S. Central Credit Union (Defunct)
 U.S. Eagle Federal Credit Union
 USA Federal Credit Union
 USALLIANCE Financial Federal Credit Union
 USU Charter Credit Union
 Veridian Credit Union
 Verity Credit Union
 Vermont Federal Credit Union
 Visions Federal Credit Union
 VyStar Credit Union
 Washington State Employees Credit Union
 Webster First Federal Credit Union, Massachusetts
 Wescom Credit Union
 Western Bridge Corporate Federal Credit Union (Defunct)
 Wings Financial Credit Union
 Wright-Patt Credit Union

See also

 Banking in the United States
 History of credit unions

References

External links
 World Council of Credit Unions trade association for credit unions
 Cornerstone Credit Union League league for credit unions

Credit Unions